James Garneth Carter (December 15, 1877 - 1949) was an African-American U.S. diplomatic official. Among his posts, he served as American consul in Tamatave, Madagascar and Calais and Bordeaux, France.   Carter was born in Brunswick, Georgia and worked as a tailor, newspaper manager, post office worker, and merchant. He declined a posting to Liberia.

Carter served as consul in Tamatave from 1906 until 1916; in Tananarive from 1916 until 1927; and then in France in Calais from 1927 until 1940; in Bordeaux in 1940. He returned to Madagascar as U.S. Consul General in Tananarive from 1941 until 1942.

He sent samples of beans from Madagascar (red, white and red and white).  He also served in Sivas.  He reported in the opening of the Madagascar Railway. He also reported on the extent of belting and the effect of tariffs in American belts. He also reported on the island of Reunion.

According to then Assistant Secretary of State for Administration Donald Russell, while Carter was stationed in Calais during the 1940 German invasion of France, instead of retreating with the French he drove a car into German territory, followed the Rhine River upstream and drove into Switzerland.

He and his wife had a daughter Hewlett Amelia born December 24, 1923, at Tananarive in Madagascar.

References

1877 births
1949 deaths
African-American diplomats
American expatriates in Madagascar
American expatriates in France